Michal Grošek (born June 1, 1975) is a Czech former professional ice hockey right winger.  He played in the National Hockey League for 11 seasons, from 1993 to 2004.

Career
Grošek was drafted 145th overall by the Winnipeg Jets in the 1993 NHL Entry Draft.  Upon suiting up for the Jets, he made history by becoming the first Czech born player to play for the club.  In total, he played in 526 career NHL games, scoring 84 goals and 137 assists for 221 points. Grošek's best offensive season was the 1998–99 season, when he was playing with the Buffalo Sabres. Grošek registered career highs in goals (20), assists (30), points (50), penalty minutes (102), and shots (140) during that season. In 2000, he requested a trade and was thus traded to the Chicago Blackhawks for Doug Gilmour and J.P. Dumont. After Chicago, Grošek played for the New York Rangers and the Boston Bruins but was never able to recapture his form shown in 1998-99.  Grošek has since expressed regret over the trade, calling it "my big mistake" and stating he should have stayed in Buffalo.

After departing from the NHL, Grošek moved to Switzerland, suiting up for Nationalliga A side Genève-Servette HC, where he was the team's top goal scorer with 15 goals. He then moved to the Russian Super League, playing for SKA Saint Petersburg, where he scored just 3 goals in 13 games before returning to Servette, where he managed 9 goals in 17 games. In 2006, he moved to EV Zug, staying for two seasons before moving to Leksands IF in HockeyAllsvenskan.

In September 2008, Grošek was named head coach of Swiss lower league team CP Meyrin, ending his playing career.

Career statistics

References

External links

1975 births
Living people
Boston Bruins players
Buffalo Sabres players
Chicago Blackhawks players
Czech ice hockey coaches
Czech ice hockey right wingers
EV Zug players
Czech expatriate ice hockey players in Russia
Genève-Servette HC players
Hartford Wolf Pack players
HC Fribourg-Gottéron players
PSG Berani Zlín players
Leksands IF players
Moncton Hawks players
New York Rangers players
People from Vyškov
SKA Saint Petersburg players
Springfield Falcons players
Tacoma Rockets players
Winnipeg Jets (1979–1996) draft picks
Winnipeg Jets (1979–1996) players
Sportspeople from the South Moravian Region
Czech expatriate ice hockey players in Canada
Czech expatriate ice hockey players in the United States
Czech expatriate ice hockey players in Switzerland
Czech expatriate ice hockey players in Sweden